The StarLadder Major: Berlin 2019, also known as StarLadder Major 2019 or Berlin 2019, was the fifteenth Counter-Strike: Global Offensive (CS:GO) Major Championship. It was held in Berlin, Germany from August 23 to September 8, 2019. Fourteen teams qualified for this Major based on their placement at the previous Major, Katowice 2019, while another ten teams qualified from their respective regional qualifiers. It featured a  prize pool, the eighth consecutive Major with this prize pool. It was also the first time the Ukrainian-based organization StarLadder. along with its long-term Chinese partner ImbaTV, hosted a Major.

Astralis won the final against underdogs AVANGAR to become the only team in CS:GO history to win four Majors, and the only team to win three Majors consecutively. Astralis's Nicolai "dev1ce" Reedtz was the MVP, joining coldzera as the only players to have two Major MVPs.

Background 
Counter-Strike: Global Offensive is a multiplayer first-person shooter video game developed by Hidden Path Entertainment and Valve. It is the fourth game in the Counter-Strike series. In professional CS:GO, the Valve-sponsored Majors are the most prestigious tournaments.

The defending champions were Astralis, after winning their second consecutive and third total Major at IEM Katowice 2019. Astralis and Fnatic entered the tournament tied for most Major titles.

Format 
The Major cycle began with four Minors, or regional qualifiers: Americas, Asia, CIS, and Europe. Two teams from each qualifier moved on to the Major. In addition, because Valve reduced the number of direct Major invites from sixteen to fourteen, the third-place teams at each respective Minor advanced to a third-place qualifier that sent two more teams to the Major.

The Major featured twenty-four teams. The top eight teams from the Katowice 2019 were the Legends, and the remaining sixteen teams—the teams that placed ninth through fourteenth at Katowice and the ten teams that advanced from the Minors—were known as Challengers. 

The Major was split into three stages. The first stage was the New Challengers stage, featuring all Challengers in a Swiss-system tournament: the top eight teams advanced to the next stage and the bottom eight teams were eliminated. Teams in the New Challengers stage were initially given an Elo ranking based on the HLTV world rankings. Each round of matches was seeded based on this Elo system. The second stage was the New Legends stage, a second Swiss-system group stage seeded in the same way. This stage featured the eight Legends from the Katowice Major and the eight teams advancing from the New Challengers stage. Like the New Challengers stage, the New Legends stage also advanced the top eight teams and eliminated the bottom eight teams. All teams from this stage except the bottom two teams earned automatic invites to the following Major. The final stage was the New Champions stage, and teams that advanced to this stage received Legends status at the following Major. This stage featured an eight team, best-of-three, single elimination bracket.

Map Pool 
The map pool for this Major changed from Katowice 2019. Valve took Cache out of the map pool and announced it would be redesigned. Rather than reintroducing Cobblestone, which had been in the map pool in previous Majors, Valve added Vertigo to the competitive map pool for the first time.

Minors 
Each regional qualifier, called "Minors", featured eight teams. Each Minor also had a 50,000 prize pool, with first place receiving 30,000, second place taking in 15,000, and third place raking in the last 5,000. Like past recent Minors, no teams were directly invited to the Minors.  There is no prize pool for the third place play in.  The Europe and Americas Minors will start on July 17 and last until July 21.  The CIS and Asia Minors will start on July 24 and last until July 28; the third place play in will take place on July 29.

Each Minor will feature two groups of four teams in a standard, GSL format group stage. The highest and lowest seed of the group and then other two teams will play in a best of one. The winners will play in a best of three and then the losers will play in a best of three. The winner of the winner's match will qualify for the bracket stage while the loser of the loser's match will be eliminated. The last two teams in the group will play in a best of three; the winner will move on to the bracket stage and the loser will be eliminated. The bracket stage will be a four team, best of three, double elimination bracket. The top two teams will qualify for the New Challengers stage of the Major, the third place team will have another shot in the third place play-in, while the fourth place team will be eliminated.

The third place play-in will be a four team, double elimination bracket. The initial and winner's match will be a best of one while the elimination matches will be a best of three. The top three teams move on to the Major as Cloud9 lost their Major spot so the spot is replaced by a team from the third place play-in.

Americas Minor 
The Americas Minor will feature six teams from North America and two teams from South America. The North American closed qualifier featured sixteen teams, with eight teams being invited and another eight teams coming from four open qualifiers. Like the Europe Minor closed qualifier, the North America qualifier was a sixteen team, double elimination, best of three bracket. Notable teams such as Luminosity Gaming, Team Envy, and Boston 2018 champions Cloud9 failed to make it to the Minor. The South America qualifier initially had eight invited teams, but DETONA Gaming's Vinicius "v$m" Moreira had a VAC ban, forcing the team to withdraw from the qualifier. The last spot was filled in by a last chance qualifier.

Notes

Europe Minor 
The Europe Minor closed qualifier featured sixteen teams. No teams were invited to the Minor, but eight teams were invited to the closed qualifier while another eight teams came from four open qualifiers. The closed qualifier was a sixteen team, double elimination, best of three bracket. Notable teams such as Virtus.pro, OpTic Gaming, Heroic, and Windigo Gaming did not qualify for the Minor.

Asia Minor 
The Asia Minor will feature eight teams. Unlike the other Minors, the Asia Minor featured teams from six geographical regions. All qualifiers featured four invited teams with four more coming from two open qualifiers, except for the Greater China qualifier – which had sixteen teams, eight of which were invited – and the African qualifier – which had no invited teams. All qualifiers were a double elimination, best of three bracket.

CIS Minor 
The CIS Minor will feature eight teams. The CIS closed qualifier featured the same format as the other Minor qualifiers. Notable teams such as Vega Squadron, pro100, and Winstrike Team failed to make it to the Minor.

Minor play-in
This qualifier featured the teams that placed third in their respective Minors. This phase was a four team, best of three, double elimination bracket. The opening matches were the Asia Minor representative against the Europe Minor representative and the CIS Minor team versus the Americans Minor team. After Cloud9 forfeited its spot by not fielding the majority of its lineup from the last Major, a third team would qualify from this qualifier.

Broadcast Talent
The Major was streamed in various languages across Twitch. It was also streamed on StarLadder's YouTube channel, Steam.tv, and on CS:GO's in-game viewing client GOTV.

Desk Hosts
 Tres "stunna" Saranthus
 Matthew "Sadokist" Trivett

Interviewers
 Sue "Smix" Lee
 James Banks

Analysts
 Chad "SPUNJ" Burchill
 Sean "seang@res" Gares
 Jacob "Pimp" Winneche
 Duncan "Thorin" Shields

Commentators
 Henry "HenryG" Greer
 Alex "Machine" Richardson
 Anders "Anders" Blume
 Jason "moses" O'Toole
 James "JFZB" Bardolph
 Daniel "ddk" Kapadia
 Harry "JustHarry" Russell
 Hugo Byron

Teams competing

New Challengers stage
The New Challengers stage took place from August 23 to August 26, 2019, at the Verti Music Hall. The Challengers stage, also known as the Preliminary stage and formerly known as the offline qualifier, is a sixteen team swiss tournament. Initial seeding was determined using HLTV.org's world rankings from March 4 to August 12, 2019. Under each of the "Rounds" columns are the team's opponent's seed at the time the round was played, out of all teams still in the tournament.

New Legends stage
The New Legends stage, formerly known as the Group stage, used the same format as the Challengers stage. This stage took place from August 28 to September 1, 2019, at the Verti Music Hall. Next to each team's name under the "Team" column is each team's initial seeding. Under each of the "Rounds" columns are the team's opponent's seed at the time the round was played.

New Champions stage
The New Champions Stage, also known as the Playoffs, is a best of three single elimination bracket. Teams play until a winner is decided. This stage took place between September 5 to September 8 at the Mercedes-Benz Arena. Brackets were revealed shortly after Natus Vincere defeated CR4ZY in the last map of the group stages. Teams were seeded first based on their record in the New Legends stage and based on the strength of their schedule. To the left of each team's name is their seed and to the right is their score.

Bracket

Quarterfinals

ENCE vs. Renegades
Casters: James Bardolph & ddk

Team Vitality vs. AVANGAR
Casters: Anders & moses

NRG Esports vs. Natus Vincere
Casters: James Bardolph & ddk

Astralis vs. Team Liquid 
Casters: Anders & moses

Semifinals

Renegades vs. AVANGAR
Casters: James Bardolph & ddk

NRG Esports vs. Astralis 
Casters: Anders & moses

Finals

AVANGAR vs. Astralis 
Casters: Anders & moses

Final standings
The final placings are shown below. In addition, the prize distribution, seed for the next major, roster, and coaches are shown. Each team's in-game leader is shown first.

References

2019 first-person shooter tournaments
Counter-Strike: Global Offensive Majors